Albizia buntingii is a species of plant in the family Fabaceae. It is found only in Venezuela.

References

buntingii
Endemic flora of Venezuela
Trees of Venezuela
Critically endangered flora of South America
Taxonomy articles created by Polbot